Good Day for It is a 2011 independent drama film starring Robert Patrick, Samantha Mathis, Lance Henriksen, Kathy Baker, Robert Englund, and Hal Holbrook. It premiered at the Sonoma Film Festival on April 8, 2011.

Plot
Unbeknownst to her mother, a girl is meeting in a roadside cafe with her estranged father who had to abandon the family about 15 years earlier. Her father was an assistant to a crime boss and robbed him to pay for the daughter’s medical treatment. Now, the boss and his thugs have been released from prison and coincidentally meet the girl and her father in the same cafe. They immediately recognize the father and want revenge.

Cast
Robert Patrick as Luke Cain
Hal Holbrook as Hec
Samantha Mathis as Sarah Bryant
Mika Boorem as Emily
Kathy Baker as Rose Carter
Lance Henriksen as Lyle Tyrus
Richard Brake as Norman Tyrus
Robert Englund as Wayne Jackson
Christian Kane as Dale Acton
Joe Flanigan as Deputy Doug Brady
Skye McCole Bartusiak as Rachel

Production
Most of the filming took place at Memorytown, in Mount Pocono, Pennsylvania. There was also a scene filmed in Bangor, Pennsylvania. It had a budget of $2.5 million.

References

External links
 
 

2011 films
Films shot in Pennsylvania
2011 drama films
American drama films
American independent films
2011 independent films
2010s English-language films
2010s American films